Neolamprologus similis is a shell-dwelling cichlid endemic to Lake Tanganyika in Africa, where it is only known along the shores of the Democratic Republic of the Congo and Tanzania. N. similis is copper-coloured with vertical white stripes running from the head to the base of the tail.

Breeding habits
This fish is monomorphic: males and females are not visually different (males are bigger) and form small colonies or harems—depending on available space—in which the male fry are tolerated until they become active competitors of the male. Female fry are not only tolerated but are eventually courted as mates. The females also are objects of interest to neighboring males and may be targets of theft.

References

similis
Fish of Lake Tanganyika
Freshwater fish of Tanzania
Fish of the Democratic Republic of the Congo
Taxa named by Heinz Heinrich Büscher
Fish described in 1992